Paul Heinrich Fuss, also known as Pavel Nikolayevich Fuss (– ) was a Russian mathematician who served as secretary of the Imperial Academy of Sciences in Saint Petersburg.

Fuss was born in Saint Petersburg where his father Nicolas Fuss was a mathematician of Swiss origin married to Albertine Benedikte Philippine Luise Euler (1766-1822), granddaughter of Leonhard Euler. Picking up mathematical interests early in life, he worked on a solution of algebraic equations of the third degree. In 1818 he became an assistant at the Imperial Academy of Sciences, becoming a full member in 1826. After the death of his father in 1826, he became a permanent secretary at the academy and was involved in the publication of the academy reports. He edited the works of deceased members of the academy. In 1842 he worked on Euler's correspondence and writings which was finally published in 1849.

References 

1798 births
1855 deaths
19th-century mathematicians from the Russian Empire
Mathematicians from Saint Petersburg
Full members of the Saint Petersburg Academy of Sciences
Members of the Russian Academy of Sciences and its forerunners
Burials at Smolensky Lutheran Cemetery